Rockstar is a 2011 Indian Hindi-language musical romantic drama film directed by Imtiaz Ali, starring Ranbir Kapoor and Nargis Fakhri, with music composed by A. R. Rahman. The film also stars Aditi Rao Hydari, Shernaz Patel and Kumud Mishra in supporting roles, and also Shammi Kapoor, who makes his last silver screen appearance. The film was produced by Eros International Ltd. along with Shree Ashtavinayak Cine Vision Ltd. It follows Janardhan Jakhar  JJ or Jordan, who dreams of becoming a rockstar like his role model, Jim Morrison. Yet, eventually on attaining all that he dreamt of, Jordan ends up anguished and despondent, by the loss of Heer Kaul, whom he loved passionately and whose death is inadvertently caused by Jordan himself.

Produced on a budget of 600 million, Rockstar was released on 11 November 2011 and grossed 1.08 billion. The film albums was included in "Top Ten Best Hindi Film Albums of the Decade" by the Firstpost and the Film Companion. The film garnered awards and nominations in several categories, with particular praise for its direction, screenplay, Kapoor's performance, Rahman's music, cinematography, and editing. The film won 47 awards from 97 nominations.

Awards and nominations

See also 
 List of Bollywood films of 2011

Notes

References

External links 
 Accolades for Rockstar at the Internet Movie Database

Lists of accolades by Indian film